George I. Lovatt Sr.  (February 13, 1872 – September 5, 1958) was an American architect who designed numerous Roman Catholic churches in Eastern Pennsylvania, New Jersey, and elsewhere during the late 19th and early 20th centuries.

Childhood and architectural education

George Ignatius Lovatt Sr. was born on February 13, 1872, in Philadelphia County, Pennsylvania.  He studied at the Pennsylvania Museum and School of Industrial Art during the academic terms 1890/91 and 1892/93. His first documented commission resulted from the death of Adrian Worthington Smith, who had begun work on the Monastery of the Visitation (now demolished) in Wilmington, Delaware. Following Smith's death in 1892, Lovatt completed the convent and continued his studies at the PMSI at the same time.  In 1894 he established an architectural practice in Philadelphia, with offices at 424 Walnut Street.

Practice

Lovatt proved to be a formidable competitor for the considerable Catholic church work which was initiated in the time. Although Edwin Forrest Durang and Henry Dagit designed a number of Catholic church and institutional buildings, Durang's firm moved  to New York City in the 1930s, leaving Dagit, Lovatt, and the Hoffman-Henon firm to divide major Catholic commissions.
 
Lovatt's firm received both local and national honors, including a commendation for the Church of the Most Precious Blood, Philadelphia, in 1926 at the International Exhibition held in Barcelona, Spain. He followed this honor in 1930 by winning the Philadelphia Chapter of the AIA's gold medal for his Church of the Holy Child, Philadelphia. In 1927 he was joined in the firm by his son George I. Lovatt Jr., but did not retire until 1940.  He died September 5, 1958, in Darby, Delaware County, Pennsylvania.

Works include

 Cathedral of the Blessed Sacrament,  Altoona, Pennsylvania
 Holy Spirit Church, Asbury Park, New Jersey
 Ascension Church, Bradley Beach, New Jersey
 St. Joseph Church, Camden, New Jersey
 Holy Name Church, Camden, New Jersey
 Our Lady Star of the Sea Church, Cape May, New Jersey
 Church of The Immaculate Heart of Mary, Chester, Pennsylvania
 St. John Church, Collingswood, New Jersey
 Sacred Heart of Jesus Church, Cornwall, Pennsylvania
 St. Elizabeth Church and Convent, Cornwells Heights, Pennsylvania
 Blessed Virgin Mary Church, Darby, Pennsylvania
 St. Andrew Church, Drexel Hill, Pennsylvania
 St. Joseph Church, Equality, Illinois
 Assumption Church, Hackettstown, New Jersey
 Cathedral of Saint Patrick in Harrisburg, Harrisburg, Pennsylvania
 St. Mary Magdeline Church, Millville, New Jersey
 Holy Saviour Church, Norristown, Pennsylvania
 Immaculate Conception Church, Philadelphia
 Holy Angels Church, Philadelphia
 Holy Cross Church, Philadelphia
 St. Anthony of Padua Church, Philadelphia
 St. Bridgit Church, Philadelphia
 St. Agnes Church, Philadelphia
 St. Aloysius Church, Philadelphia
 St. Ambrose Church, Philadelphia
 Our Lady of Hope (Holy Child) Church, Philadelphia
 St. Leo Church, Philadelphia
 Acts of the Apostles (former) Church, Philadelphia
 Sacred Heart Church, Phoenixville, Pennsylvania
 St. Ann Church, Wildwood, New Jersey
 Sacred Heart of Jesus Church, Williamstown, Pennsylvania
 St. Philomena Church, Lansdowne, Pennsylvania,
 St. Ann Church, Wilmington, Delaware
 St. Elisabeth Church, Wilmington, Delaware
 St. Joseph Church, Wilmington, Delaware
 St. Peter Church, Columbia, South Carolina

References 

1872 births
1958 deaths
American ecclesiastical architects
Architects of Roman Catholic churches
Architects of cathedrals
Architects from Pennsylvania